Tarlena is a village on the north-west coast of Bougainville Island, in the Autonomous Region of Bougainville of Papua New Guinea.

The Bishop Wade Secondary School is located at the village.

Populated places in the Autonomous Region of Bougainville